Edgar Bismarck Andrade Rentería (born 2 March 1988) is a Mexican former professional footballer who played as a midfielder. He made his debut in Cruz Azul on January 28, 2006, in a game against Atlas which resulted in a draw. He was on the Mexico national football under-17 team that won the 2005 FIFA U-17 World Championship. While playing for Cruz Azul he broke his ankle while attempting to recover a ball for his team, in a 2007 match against Estudiantes Tecos UAG. After many months of recovery, he returned to the field in 2007.

International Caps 

As of 12 June 2012

Honours
Morelia
Copa MX: Apertura 2013

Veracruz
Copa MX: Clausura 2016

Mexico U17
FIFA U-17 World Championship: 2005

External links
 
 

1988 births
Living people
Mexico international footballers
Mexico youth international footballers
Association football midfielders
Cruz Azul footballers
Chiapas F.C. footballers
Atlético Morelia players
C.F. Pachuca players
C.D. Veracruz footballers
Liga MX players
Footballers from Veracruz
Mexican footballers